The Gurzhi effect was theoretically predicted by Radii Gurzhi in 1963, and it consists of decreasing of electric resistance  of a finite size conductor with increasing of its temperature  (i.e. the situation  for some temperature interval). Gurzhi effect usually being considered as the evidence of electron hydrodynamic transport in conducting media. The mechanism of Gurzhi effect is the following. The electron reflection from the boundary is assumed to be diffusive.

Also we assume . Thus the resistance for lowest temperatures is a constant (see the picture). The Gurzhi effect appears when the temperature is increased to have  . Therefore, Gurzhi effect can be observed when .

Gurzhi effect corresponds to unusual situation when electrical resistance depends on a frequency of normal collisions. As one can see this effect appears due to the presence of a boundaries with finite characteristic size  . Later Gurzhi's group discovered a special role of electron hydrodynamics in a spin transport. This magnetic inhomogeneity stops electrons of the one spin component which becomes an effective scatterers for electrons of another spin component. In this case magnetoresistance of a conductor depends on the frequency of normal electron-electron collisions as well as in the Gurzhi effect.

References 

Electric current